Anthony Braxton / Robert Schumann String Quartet is an album by composer/saxophonist Anthony Braxton in concert with the Robert Schumann String Quartet recorded in 1979 by Westdeutscher Rundfunk and originally released on the Sound Aspects label in 1986.

Reception

The AllMusic review by Brian Olewnick stated: "For jazz fans, this certainly ranks as one of the more difficult releases from Braxton ... Fans of his classical side will want this release for the string quartet while aficionados of his solo work will greatly enjoy those herein. Relatively rare will be the listener who gets equal enjoyment from both."

Track listing
All compositions by Anthony Braxton are graphically titled and the following attempts to translate the title to text.

 "8KN-(B-12) | R10 [Composition 17]" - 16:57
 "AOTH MBA H [Composition 26 E]" - 3:38
 "(448-R) | C-234 [Composition 26 I]" - 3:07
 "8KN-(B-12) | R10 [Composition 17]" - 14:20
 "KSZMK PQ EGN [Composition 77 D]" - 2:55
 "SOVA NOUB V-(AO) [Composition 77 E]" - 2:56
 "RORRT 33H7T 4 [Composition 77 B]" - 2:44
 "NATK TD-(B) [Composition 26 B]" - 3:58

Personnel
Anthony Braxton - alto saxophone (tracks 1-3 & 5-8)
Robert Schumann Quartet: (tracks 1 & 4)
Michael Gaiser, Chiharu Yuuki - violin
Jürgen Weber - viola
Wolfgang Mehlhorn - cello

References

Anthony Braxton albums
1986 albums